Red hat merchant, alternatively translated as red-hat businessman, entrepreneur with red hat, refers to a government official who also appears as a businessman, combining the roles of civil servant and businessman, that is, "government businessman". The term originated from the Qing dynasty and was initially used to describe state officials who were also engaged in commercial activities. At that time, wealthy officials often wore caps with rubies. The typical representative of the "red hat merchant" is Hu Xueyan, a prominent businessman in the late Qing dynasty.

Nowadays, the term "red hat merchant" is widely used to refer to a businessperson who has good relationships with important high-level government officials.

References

Business terms
Political terminology